La Vina (Spanish: La Viña, meaning "The Vine") is a census-designated place in Madera County, California, United States. The population was 637 at the 2020 census, up from 279 in 2010.

A post office operated at La Vina from 1891 to 1895.

Geography

Demographics

The 2010 United States Census reported that La Vina had a population of 279. The racial makeup of La Vina was 117 (41.9%) White, 3 (1.1%) African American, 0 (0.0%) Native American, 0 (0.0%) Asian, 0 (0.0%) Pacific Islander, 150 (53.8%) from other races, and 9 (3.2%) from two or more races. Hispanic or Latino of any race were 265 persons (95.0%).

The Census reported that 279 people (100% of the population) lived in households, 0 (0%) lived in non-institutionalized group quarters, and 0 (0%) were institutionalized.

There were 63 households, out of which 42 (66.7%) had children under the age of 18 living in them, 41 (65.1%) were opposite-sex married couples living together, 8 (12.7%) had a female householder with no husband present, 6 (9.5%) had a male householder with no wife present.  There were 2 (3.2%) unmarried opposite-sex partnerships, and 0 (0%) same-sex married couples or partnerships. 7 households (11.1%) were made up of individuals, and 4 (6.3%) had someone living alone who was 65 years of age or older. The average household size was 4.43.  There were 55 families (87.3% of all households); the average family size was 4.62.

The population was spread out, with 78 people (28.0%) under the age of 18, 50 people (17.9%) aged 18 to 24, 69 people (24.7%) aged 25 to 44, 51 people (18.3%) aged 45 to 64, and 31 people (11.1%) who were 65 years of age or older.  The median age was 27.6 years. For every 100 females, there were 103.6 males.  For every 100 females age 18 and over, there were 120.9 males.

The homeowner vacancy rate was 2.5%; the rental vacancy rate was 11.1%.  172 people (61.6% of the population) lived in owner-occupied housing units and 107 people (38.4%) lived in rental housing units.

References

Census-designated places in Madera County, California
Census-designated places in California